Joyce Molyneux (17 April 1931 – 27 October 2022) was a British chef and restaurateur, who became one of the first women to receive a Michelin star.

Writing in The Telegraph in 2003, Jan Moir said "Throughout the 1970s and 1980s, the chef, Joyce Molyneux, was at the forefront of the growth of modern British cooking".

Molyneux worked in just three restaurant kitchens, Mulberry Tree in Stratford-upon-Avon in the 1950s, Hole in the Wall in Bath in the 1960s, and for 25 years at The Carved Angel in Dartmouth, Devon until her retirement in 1999.

In 1959 she met Stephen Rodríguez-García, who was working at the Mulberry Tree as a waiter. He became her partner until his death in 1994.

Bibliography 
 The Carved Angel Cookery Book (1990)Credited to Joyce Molyneux and Sophie Grigson. 
 Born to Cook: Angel Food (2011)

References

External links

1931 births
2022 deaths
British chefs
20th-century British non-fiction writers
21st-century British non-fiction writers
Place of birth missing
Women chefs
British women non-fiction writers
20th-century British women writers
21st-century British women writers
Women cookbook writers